The Royal York Royals are a defunct Junior "A" ice hockey team from North York, Ontario, Canada.  They were a part of the Ontario Provincial Junior A Hockey League. The team was based at Downsview Arena in the Downsview neighbourhood. The team was originally named the Downsview Bees from 1971–1972, the Downsview Beavers from 1972–1974, and the Royal York Royals from 1974–1980.

History
The Downsview Bees started operations in 1971, as part of the Metro Junior B league.  In 1972, the team was one of six Metro teams to join the new OPJHL, changing its name to Beavers to reflect that they no longer were playing "Junior B" hockey.  They became the Royals in 1974 and started having some success.  After four consecutive years near the top of the league and little playoff success, the Royals folded in 1980.

In 1978, the Royals made it to the league finals to contend for the Buckland Trophy.  Their opponent was the Guelph Platers.  The Platers defeated the Royals 4-games-1. An incident in a 1975 game against the Markham Waxers where the Royals' goalkeeper, Kim Crouch, had his throat slashed open when diving into a fray lead to the development of the Kim Crouch collar, a protective neck-guard that was eventually adopted widely hockey players.

Season-by-season results

Playoffs
1973 DNQ
1974 DNQ
1975 DNQ
1976 Lost Preliminary
Toronto Nationals defeated Royal York Royals 3-games-to-2
1977 Lost Semi-final
Royal York Royals defeated Wexford Raiders 4-games-to-2
North York Rangers defeated Royal York Royals 4-games-to-2
1978 Lost Final
Royal York Royals defeated Newmarket Flyers 4-games-to-2
Royal York Royals defeated Dixie Beehives 4-games-to-none
Guelph Platers defeated Royal York Royals 4-games-to-1
1979 Lost Quarter-final
North York Rangers defeated Royal York Royals 4-games-to-3
1980 Lost Final
Royal York Royals defeated North Bay Trappers 4-games-to-3
Royal York Royals defeated Aurora Tigers 4-games-to-2
North York Rangers defeated Royal York Royals 4-games-to-1

References

External links
OHA Website

Defunct ice hockey teams in Canada
Ice hockey teams in Toronto
North York
1971 establishments in Ontario
1980 disestablishments in Ontario
Ice hockey clubs established in 1971
Sports clubs disestablished in 1980